Wu Qingfeng may refer to:

Wu Tsing-fong (born 1982), or Wu Qingfeng, Taiwanese singer-songwriter
Wu Qingfeng (swimmer) (born 2003), Chinese swimmer